The Rural Municipality of Redburn No. 130 is a rural municipality (RM) in the Canadian province of Saskatchewan within Census Division No. 6 and  Division No. 2. It is located southeast of the City of Moose Jaw in the south-central portion region of the province.

History 
The RM of Redburn No. 130 incorporated as a rural municipality on January 1, 1913.

Geography

Communities and localities 
The following urban municipalities are surrounded by the RM.

Towns
Rouleau

Villages
Briercrest
Drinkwater

The following unincorporated communities are within the RM.

Localities
Hearne
Pitman

Demographics 

Government 
The RM of Redburn No. 130 is governed by an elected municipal council and an appointed administrator that meets on the second Thursday of every month. The reeve of the RM is Ronald Hughes while its administrator is Guy Lagrandeur. The RM's office is located in Rouleau.

See also 
List of rural municipalities in Saskatchewan

References 

Redburn

Division No. 6, Saskatchewan